Diédougou is a rural commune in the Cercle of Ségou in the Ségou Region of Mali. The commune includes 21 villages in an area of approximately 409 square kilometers. In the census of 2009 it had a population of 13,268. The main village (chef-lieu) is Yolo which lies 80 km east-northeast of Ségou.

References

External links
.

Communes of Ségou Region